Selaön is the largest island in Mälaren, Sweden, and covers 94.72 km². It is located at Stallarholmen, east of Strängnäs, and it has about 1,800 permanent residents. It is connected by a bridge to the mainland. It is the largest island in any lake in Sweden.

In the Heimskringla, Granmar, the king of Södermanland, was murdered on this island by Ingjald Illruler.

References

Islands of Mälaren
Landforms of Södermanland County
Lake islands of Sweden